The Morgan County Courthouse in Madison, Georgia is the third courthouse built for Morgan County.  The first courthouse was built on the town square in 1809. The second courthouse was built in 1845 and was destroyed by fire in 1916. The current courthouse was constructed in 1904 to 1905. It was designed in the Beaux Arts style and features a portico entrance on the corner.  It was renovated in 2005.

It was designed by J. S. Golucke and Company and built by the Winder Lumber Company.  It was described as being "distinguished by a pronounced, enriched entablature, limestone lintels, sills and string courses, giant order Corinthian or Composite columns and a large, domed cupola".

See also
 Madison Historic District (Madison, Georgia)

References

External links

Buildings and structures in Morgan County, Georgia
County courthouses in Georgia (U.S. state)
Government buildings completed in 1905
Beaux-Arts architecture in Georgia (U.S. state)
1905 establishments in Georgia (U.S. state)